A game show is a type of radio, television, or internet program in which contestants, television personalities or celebrities, sometimes as part of a team, play a game which involves answering trivia questions or solving puzzles, usually for prizes. Game shows are usually distinguishable from reality television competition shows, in which the competition consumes an entire season of episodes; in a game show, prizes can typically be won in a single match (in some cases, particularly in the ones that offer record-setting prizes, contestants can play multiple matches and accumulate a larger total). Beginning with the first five-figure and six-figure game show jackpots in the mid-1950s, a succession of contestants on various quiz shows of the era each set records. Teddy Nadler of The $64,000 Challenge, the highest-scoring contestant of the 1950s era, was not surpassed until 1980, when Thom McKee won $312,700 on Tic-Tac-Dough. Between 1999 and 2001, during a brief boom in high-stakes game shows, the record was broken six times. Both the 1955–1958 and 1999–2001 eras of rapidly set and broken records were driven primarily by one-upmanship between the networks each trying to secure bragging rights and ratings by inflating their prize offerings, rather than the merits of the contestants themselves. American daytime television has historically had smaller prize budgets for game shows that air in that daypart.

, the top three winners in American game show history all earned the majority of their winnings from the quiz show Jeopardy!, which has aired since 1984 and has had no hard earnings limit since 2003. Ken Jennings is the highest-earning American game show contestant of all time, having accumulated a total of $5,223,414. He took the record back from Brad Rutter as the highest-earning contestant (a record Rutter had held since 2014) by virtue of his victory on January 14, 2020, in the Jeopardy! The Greatest of All Time tournament.

Daytime game shows
Most daytime game show top prizes were limited to $25,000 during the 1960s and 1970s, a restriction made for both budgetary concerns and to assuage criticism that arose from the 1950s quiz show scandals. The limits were usually imposed by the networks themselves; CBS, for example, had a limit of $25,000 that stayed intact until the mid-1980s. ABC also had a limit, which was eventually dropped. NBC, however, opted not to employ such a limit and allowed show producers to set them if they saw fit.

Single day record
The single day record for shows in daytime television was set by Michael Larson in 1984, who won $110,237 on Press Your Luck. Larson achieved this record by memorizing the show's board patterns, repeatedly hitting the board's squares that awarded contestants money and an additional spin, which would, in turn, replace the spin he had just used, effectively allowing him to spin the board in the second round as long as he wanted. Because of this, his game had to be split into two episodes (which aired June 8 and June 11), as his turn caused the game to go well over the show's half-hour allotted time. At the time of the show's airing, CBS only allowed contestants to win up to $50,000 on a game show (contestants would retire after winning $25,000); the winnings limit increased to $75,000 in November and $100,000 in 1986 (and later $125,000 by 1990) before being permanently eliminated in 2006. In March 2003, Game Show Network produced a documentary about the event featuring Ed Long and Janie Litras-Dakan, the contestants Larson handily defeated in 1984.

In 2006, Vickyann Chrobak-Sadowski set a new record by winning $147,517 on the 35th-season premiere of The Price Is Right, winning a Dodge Caravan playing "Push Over", $1,000 cash and both showcases, one of which included a Dodge Viper. In 2013, Chrobak-Sadowski was succeeded by Sheree Heil, who set the record by winning $170,345 on The Price Is Right "Best of 2013" special aired December 30, 2013 by winning an Audi R8 playing "Gas Money", $10,000 cash and Prada shoes. In 2016, Heil was succeeded by Christen Freeman, who set the record by winning $210,000 on October 28, during the show's "Big Money Week" special. As Cliff Hangers was the episode's Big Money game, game rules were modified to offer a top prize of $250,000, which was reduced by $10,000 for every step the mountain climber took. In addition to her One Bid prize and an additional $1,000 won during the Showcase Showdown, Freeman's grand total was $212,879, setting a new daytime record.

The current single-day record holder is Michael Stouber, who won a total of $262,743 on the October 14, 2019, episode of The Price Is Right. Stouber's appearance occurred during a special "Big Money Week" promotion in which games normally played for standard prizes had increased values or special cash awards offered. Stouber played the pricing game Plinko, normally played for a top prize of $50,000. On this special episode, the top prize was increased to $1,000,000, with the middle slot's value increased from $10,000 to $200,000. Stouber won a total of $202,000 during the game, plus his showcase and an accumulating jackpot of prizes (worth $29,657).

Overall winnings record

1955–1958

During the early quiz show boom of the mid-1950s, Richard McCutcheon set the first major winnings record by winning the title prize on The $64,000 Question on September 13, 1955, matched shortly thereafter by Joyce Brothers on December 3, despite producers attempting to give her questions they thought she could not answer. Ethel Park Richardson set the next winnings record of $100,000 on The Big Surprise on December 10.

Richardson's record would stand for more than a year, before being surpassed by Charles Van Doren on January 21, 1957, who was playing Twenty One. Van Doren, who won $129,000 total, was almost immediately passed by on February 10 by 11-year-old Leonard Ross. Ross, through earlier winnings on The Big Surprise and a new appearance on The $64,000 Question, reached $164,000. Ross's total was surpassed by ten-year-old Robert Strom, on The $64,000 Question on April 16. Strom would go on to win $242,600 in various game show appearances by mid-1958. Finally, Teddy Nadler collected winnings on The $64,000 Question and The $64,000 Challenge through 1957 and 1958 sufficient to eclipse Strom's winnings on August 24, 1958, on the way to $264,000.

1950s quiz show scandals 

Nadler's record would stand for more than two decades, because in the fall of 1958, allegations that many big-money quiz shows were fixed were corroborated; several of the programs under scrutiny were almost immediately cancelled. Herb Stempel, who had won $69,500 on Twenty One, openly admitted that his defeat by Charles Van Doren had been scripted. Van Doren, by comparison, insisted he had wanted to do the show honestly and refused to speak on the topic for decades afterward, until writing an essay on the subject for The New Yorker in 2008. Joyce Brothers's winnings, which added up to $128,000 after a follow-up win on The $64,000 Challenge, were ultimately upheld as legitimate, and she went on to a prolonged career as a psychologist and media personality. Nadler, a middle-school dropout, failed a civil service exam trying to get a temporary job with the United States Census Bureau in 1960. His breadth of knowledge was never questioned; Nadler was not implicated for any role in the quiz show scandals. In a 1970 Nadler interview and article, people connected with the shows Nadler was on stated that he "had been shown some questions before air time, but it didn't matter when he saw them – he knew the answers anyway." Nadler died on May 23, 1984, at the age of 74.

The quiz show scandals caused sweeping changes in television game show production. These changes, which lasted decades, included the imposition of limits on future prize amounts, limits on the number of times game champions could return, and a change in emphasis in most game shows away from "recall of factual knowledge" as the means to win. As with much programming of the early 1960s, game shows of the era were criticized for dumbing down; Let's Make a Deal, a breakout hit game show that debuted in 1963, was belittled as  "mindless" and "demeaning to traders and audiences alike". The establishment of the original version of Jeopardy!, with its low stakes (no contestant won more than $12,000 including tournament play during the show's original 11-year daytime run) and five-game limit, helped ease the stigma against the quiz show.

1980s 
A reboot of Tic-Tac-Dough, which by 1980 was running in syndication, did allow its returning champion to play until defeated, and had no winnings cap. When Tic Tac Dough games ended in ties, potential game winnings would carry over to the next game, and both champion and challenger would return. With this play structure, U.S. Naval officer named Thom McKee began a winning streak on Tic Tac Dough that carried from the spring of 1980 into the 1980–1981 season. McKee passed Nadler's record in tapings recorded over the summer of that year as revealed in a leak to the press. McKee won $312,700 in cash and prizes in 43 games, which included eight cars (on Tic Tac Dough a contestant received a new car after every fifth game won). McKee's record on Tic Tac Dough was not surpassed by another player, and this was in part because when WCBS-TV in New York purchased the right to air the syndicated Tic Tac Dough in 1983, CBS (the station's owner) realized that airing a game show without a winnings cap on a station it owned was a violation of its own Broadcast Standards and Practices. CBS requested to the producers of Tic Tac Dough that a winnings limit of $50,000 be imposed, and the show complied with this request.

While Thom McKee was the biggest solo game show winner until 1999, nine couples on The $1,000,000 Chance of a Lifetime shared the show's top prize of $1,000,000 awarded in a combination of prizes and a long-term annuity, during that show's run in syndication from January 1986 to May 1987.

1999–2004: Million-dollar game shows 
In 1999, McKee's winnings total was passed by Michael Shutterly, who became the biggest winner in the first season of Who Wants to Be a Millionaire in the United States. Shutterly was the first contestant on the show to get to the 15th and final question but elected to walk instead with $500,000 which made him the biggest winner in American game show history at the time. Shutterly had previously won $49,200 as a four-day champion on Jeopardy! in 1988, making his career winnings total $549,200. On November 19, during the second season of Millionaire in the United States, the show crowned its first million-dollar winner when John Carpenter won the show's top prize without using any lifelines, save for a phone call on the final question, which he used to inform his father that he was going to win the million dollars. After Carpenter answered the final question, which concerned Richard Nixon's appearance on Laugh-In in 1968, host Regis Philbin proclaimed Carpenter the show's (and worldwide format's) first top-prize winner. Carpenter's record remained intact until the following year.

The ratings success of Millionaire sparked a brief glut of high-stakes game shows from the other networks, each attempting to outdo the other. In early 2000, Rahim Oberholtzer, a contestant on the revival of NBC's Twenty One, won four games in his appearances on the show, along with $120,000 in the show's "Perfect 21" bonus round, for a total of $1,120,000. For surpassing Carpenter's mark, then-host Maury Povich proclaimed Oberholtzer "the TV Game Show King". Late in its run, the Fox game show Greed brought back some of its previous winners to try for an extra $1,000,000. Curtis Warren, who was part of the first team to win $1,000,000 on the show (of which his share was $400,000, plus $10,000 for winning a terminator round), was one of the contestants brought back to do so on February 11, 2000. Warren was given a question about TV shows that had been made into movies, with eight choices (of which he had to identify the four correct answers). He successfully did so, giving himself $1,410,000 and the record for the time being. Warren's record was even shorter lived than Oberholtzer's had been, lasting only four days. Three days before Warren's win, David Legler, who also appeared on Twenty One, began a run as champion on the show. Four days after Warren's win, the run continued, with Legler having earned a grand total of $1,765,000 in six wins to surpass Warren's record and become the third contestant in two months to top $1,000,000 on a game show.

Legler held the record for well over a year, outlasting Twenty One and Greed themselves; by July 2000, the million-dollar game show boom had gone bust and both Greed and Twenty One (along with several others) were cancelled, leaving Millionaire as the last surviving million-dollar game show on American television from that boom; it would not be until April 2001 (with the arrival of the similarly short-lived Weakest Link) that another would be attempted. By the start of 2001, the producers of Millionaire decided that it had been too long (71 episodes over a five-month period) since their top prize had been won and instituted an accumulating jackpot which added $10,000 to the grand prize amount for each episode it was not won. Kevin Olmstead claimed the top prize on April 10, 2001, winning a jackpot of $2,180,000. Olmstead became the first contestant to top $2,000,000 in total winnings on a game show and supplanted Legler as the all-time leader. In 2004, ABC launched an ultra high-stakes version of Millionaire entitled Who Wants to Be a Super Millionaire with a $10,000,000 top prize. Two separate Super Millionaire series aired, one in February and a second in May. However, despite the higher stakes and the potential for someone to top the all-time record for winnings, the largest prize awarded was $1,000,000, won by Robert Essig.

Million-dollar game shows continue to air, in somewhat lower frequency, into the present day, as several other game shows with prizes in excess of $1,000,000 (including Deal or No Deal) came and went. In 2008, Wheel of Fortune increased its top prize to $1,000,000, making it the second syndicated game show to have a top prize of that value. To date, three contestants have won Wheels million-dollar prize. Millionaire would eventually end its syndicated run in 2019; at the time it ended, it had not awarded the top prize in regular play since Nancy Christy became the first woman to top $1,000,000 in overall winnings in May 2003, making her the second-to-last million-dollar winner in the show's history.

2003–present: The Jeopardy! multimillionaires 

A rule change imposed by Jeopardy! for the 2003–04 season set the stage for a new generation of game show winnings records. For Season 20, the show eliminated its long-standing rule limiting a champion's consecutive wins to five. In doing so, Jeopardy! joined Tic Tac Dough from two decades earlier in allowing unlimited appearances by a returning champion on a quiz show. This set up the potential for winning streaks like those seen in the big-money 1950s quiz shows.

On October 15, 2003, a month into the new season, Pennsylvania college student Sean Ryan became the first champion to play (and win) a sixth game. On January 14, 2004, Tom Walsh became the first seven-game winner. But nearing the end of the season on June 2, 2004, software engineer Ken Jennings of Salt Lake City, Utah became the new champion on Jeopardy! The episode was the first in a long winning streak for the software engineer first breaking Ryan's and Walsh's accomplishments. With no limit to his appearances, Jennings began to break many game show records. As his streak continued deeper into the 21st season, Jennings was inching closer and closer to Olmstead's all-time record. On November 3, 2004, Jennings topped Olmstead's Millionaire winnings with his 65th consecutive win, finishing the day with $45,099 and a new cumulative total of $2,197,000. Jennings won nine more games before his streak came to an end on November 30, 2004, at the hands of contestant Nancy Zerg. He had extended his record total to $2,520,700 at the time of his defeat, after which he was awarded an additional $2,000 for finishing in second place per Jeopardy! rules.

Shortly after Jennings's defeat, Jeopardy! decided to see how he would fare in tournament play. On February 9, 2005, the show launched its Ultimate Tournament of Champions, inviting back 144 other past champions to compete over the next three months in a five-round single-elimination tournament with a $2,000,000 grand prize. The field included the highest-winning five-time champions and winners of some previous tournaments, though not all invitees were able to participate. Jennings received a bye into the finals of the tournament, where he faced semi-final winners Jerome Vered and Brad Rutter in a three-game, cumulative total match. Vered had set a single-day scoring record during his appearance on the show in 1992, while Rutter had won the 2001 Tournament of Champions and the 2002 Million Dollar Masters tournament and was the show's highest-earning contestant of all-time before Jennings. In the tournament's three-day final, Rutter defeated Jennings and Vered to win the tournament and $2,000,000, supplanting Jennings as the all-time highest earning American game show contestant in the process. Including the $1.27 million he had won in his previous Jeopardy! appearances (five regular season games, a Tournament of Champions win, the Million Dollar Masters win, and three matches in the earlier rounds of the Ultimate Tournament of Champions which were worth $115,000), Rutter's total stood at $3,270,102, while Jennings was now second with $3,022,700 having gained an additional $500,000 for his second-place finish in the tournament.

Jennings slowly began to chip away at Rutter's record, first by winning $714.29 in 2006 as part of the Mob on NBC's 1 vs. 100. A year later, Jennings won the Grand Slam tournament on Game Show Network and the $100,000 top prize by defeating Ogi Ogas in the final round. Finally, on October 10, 2008, Jennings passed Rutter by winning $500,000 on Are You Smarter Than a 5th Grader?; he extended the record by winning $300,000 in The IBM Challenge, where he and Rutter took on IBM supercomputer Watson in a special Jeopardy! event in 2011. Rutter won $200,000 in the challenge, in which both he and Jennings pledged half of their winnings to charity. Rutter then added $100,000 more when he appeared on Million Dollar Mind Game, raising his total to $3,570,102, second only to Jennings's $3,923,414.29.

NBC's The Million Second Quiz artificially inflated its grand prize to allow for Andrew Kravis, the winner of the ten-day tournament, to claim a record for most money won on a single game show in regular play. Kravis had only won $2,326,346 during actual play ($326,346 during the game, plus the $2,000,000 grand prize) but was awarded $2,600,000 solely so the show could lay claim to the record. Factoring overall winnings, which includes a $50,500 win on Wheel of Fortune and two consolation prizes for losing on Jeopardy! and Who Wants to Be a Millionaire, Kravis's total sits in fourth as of 2020.

In 2014, Jennings and Rutter were both invited to play in the Jeopardy! Battle of the Decades, a tournament conducted by the producers of Jeopardy! to celebrate its thirtieth season in syndication. Both men advanced to the two-day tournament final with Roger Craig (who had set the previous single-day winnings record of $77,000 in 2010) filling the third position. Needing a win to reclaim his record, Rutter took the top prize in the tournament after Jennings, who needed to answer the second day's Final Jeopardy clue correctly to win (after making a sufficient wager), failed to do so. Rutter won the top prize of $1,000,000 while Jennings won the $100,000 second prize. Jennings appeared on Millionaire in November 2014 and won $100,000, missing out his opportunity to surpass Rutter's record if he could have won the grand prize. He was then a contestant on the ABC primetime show 500 Questions in 2016; however, as he only lasted four questions, he was unable to add to his total. Both Jennings and Rutter competed in the Jeopardy! All-Star Games in 2019. Under the format of that tournament, teams of three competed in a relay to win a $1,000,000 top prize split between them. Thus, either Jennings or Rutter would be able to add up to $333,333.33 to their total as captain of their respective team if they won. It would not have been enough for Jennings to surpass Rutter. But it was Rutter's team who won the tournament, with Jennings's team finishing second and splitting $300,000.

A month after the Jeopardy! All-Star Games came to an end, James Holzhauer became the new Jeopardy! champion. The episode, which was broadcast on April 4, 2019, was the first in a 32-game winning streak where he joined Jennings and Rutter as the only contestants in Jeopardy! history to win at least $1,000,000 (as of the episode broadcast on April 23) and $2,000,000 (as of the episode broadcast on May 24). He also surpassed Roger Craig's Jeopardy! single-day winnings (on multiple occasions), pushing the record to $131,127 on the episode broadcast on April 17. Holzhauer ultimately won $2,464,216 during his Jeopardy! run, plus an additional $250,000 for winning the Tournament of Champions, which combined with his prize of $58,333.33 from his appearance on The Chase in 2014, places him third in total game show earnings.

In January 2020, Jennings, Holzhauer and Rutter all were invited back to Jeopardy! for The Greatest of All Time, a special multi-game prime time miniseries on ABC that carried a minimum $250,000 appearance fee and a $1,000,000 top prize. In the series of two-legged ties, in which the first to win three such ties won the competition, Jennings (3) defeated Holzhauer (1) and Rutter (0), to win the top prize and reclaim the overall American game show earnings lead.

All-time top 25 winnings list

Notes

References

Game shows